On Your Side is the full-length debut album by American rock band A Rocket to the Moon, released on October 13, 2009.

Track listing

Personnel

A Rocket to the Moon
 Nick Santino – vocals, guitar
 Justin Richards – guitar
 Eric Halvorsen – bass
 Andrew Cook – drums

Additional musicians
 Caitlin Harnett – vocals (on "On a Lonely Night")
 Brandon Wronski - vocals (on "Sometimes")

Charts

References

2009 albums
A Rocket to the Moon albums
Fueled by Ramen albums
Albums produced by Matt Squire
Emo pop albums